Jose Estrada may refer to: 

Jose Estrada, Sr. (born 1946), Puerto Rican professional wrestler 
Jose Estrada, Jr., his son, Puerto Rican professional wrestler
José Estrada (director) (1938–1986), Mexican film director
José Estrada González (born 1967), Cuban baseball player and Olympic gold medalist

See also
Jose Marcelo Ejercito, better known as Joseph Estrada, former actor and President of the Philippines